A Fringe of Leaves is the tenth published novel by the Australian novelist and 1973 Nobel Prize-winner, Patrick White.

Plot
A young Cornish woman, Ellen Roxburgh, travels to the Australian colony of Van Diemen's Land (now "Tasmania") in the early 1830s with her older husband, Austin, to visit his brother Garnet Roxburgh. After witnessing the brutalities of Van Diemen's Land, the Roxburghs embark on their return trip to England on the Bristol Maid. But the ship runs aground on the coral reef off the coast of what is now Queensland. Ellen is the only survivor from the leaky vessel in which the passengers and crew travel to the shore. She is rescued by the Aboriginal people of the island, and she later meets Jack Chance, a convict who has escaped from Moreton Bay (now Brisbane), the brutal penal settlement to the south. It is Chance who escorts her through the dangerous coastal territory south to the outskirts of the settlement, but who refuses to accompany her further and returns to his exile. She returns to "civilisation" transformed and tormented by her experience with Garnet in Van Diemen's Land, with the Aboriginal people, and with Chance.

The novel sets in sharp relief the distinctions between men and women, whites and blacks, the convicts and the free, and English colonists and Australian settlers. The contrast between Ellen's rural Cornish background and the English middle class she has married into is also highlighted.

Historical references
The shipwreck and rescue parts of the novel reflect the experiences of Eliza Fraser, who was also shipwrecked on the island that bears her name, met with an escaped convict who had lived alongside the island's Aboriginal people, and married a "Mr Jevons".  She, however, eventually returned to the UK.
White's novel is (arguably recursively) often cited about Fraser Island and Eliza Fraser.

References 

1976 Australian novels
Novels by Patrick White
Novels set in Queensland
Novels set in the 1830s
Jonathan Cape books